"The Purity of the Turf" is the third episode of the first series of the 1990s British comedy television series Jeeves and Wooster. It is also called "The Village Sports Day at Twing" or "The Gambling Event". The episode aired in the US on 25 November 1990 on Masterpiece Theatre.

Background 
Adapted from "Indian Summer of an Uncle" (collected in Very Good, Jeeves) and "The Purity of the Turf" (collected in The Inimitable Jeeves).

Cast
 Bertie Wooster – Hugh Laurie
 Jeeves – Stephen Fry
 Aunt Agatha – Mary Wimbush
 Uncle George – Nicholas Selby 
 Maud Wilberforce – Paula Jacobs
 Bingo Little – Michael Siberry
 Rupert Steggles – Richard Braine (as Richard Brain)
 Freddie Widgeon – Charles Millham
 Lord Wickhammersley – Jack Watling 
 Lady Wickhammersley – Richenda Carey
 Cynthia – Helena Michell
 Vicar – Jack May
 Drones Porter – Michael Ripper

Plot
Bertie's Uncle George wishes to marry a young waitress. Aunt Agatha is dismayed and, through Bertie, offers the girl £100 to break off the engagement; instead, however, Bertie meets Maud Wilberforce, who has a connection with his uncle being the uncle's long-lost barmaid love.

Bertie visits Twing Hall, where Lady Wickhammersley has banned all gambling after Lord Wickhammersley lost the East Wing in a game. Rupert Steggles has surreptitiously arranged to take bets, however, on the events at a village fair. Bertie and Bingo place bets on the competitors, only to find that Steggles has rigged the events. Jeeves duly sorts things out.

See also
 List of Jeeves and Wooster characters

References

External links

Jeeves and Wooster episodes
1990 British television episodes